Auriol Guillaume (born 14 October 1979 in Saint-Denis) is a French professional football defender, currently playing for FCMT in the Championnat National 3.

Career
In the summer 2019, the two clubs Football Club de l'Agglomération Troyennes (FCAT) and  Aube Sud Vanne Pays d'Othe (ASVPO) was dissolved, and Football club de la métropole troyenne (FCMT) was born. Guillaume joined the club ahead of the 2019-20 season at the age of 40.

References

External links

1979 births
Living people
French footballers
Guadeloupean footballers
Association football defenders
Ligue 1 players
Ligue 2 players
Championnat National players
Championnat National 2 players
Championnat National 3 players
Angers SCO players
En Avant Guingamp players
ES Troyes AC players
AS Beauvais Oise players
AS Cannes players
French people of Guadeloupean descent
Footballers from Seine-Saint-Denis